Police Officer is a 1992 Indian Hindi-language movie directed by Ashok Gaikwad and starring Jackie Shroff in a Double role other cast include Karisma Kapoor, Paresh Rawal and Sadashiv Amrapurkar. Other cast members include Aruna Irani and Satyajeet.

Plot
Kishan and Jai Ram are two brothers brought up by their mother who is a widow. On learning that their father was killed by Dindayal and his group of friends, the brothers try to avenge their father's death. In this process, Ram is killed by Dindayal, who also kills his wife. Learning this, his twin brother Kishan avenges their deaths.

Cast

Soundtrack

External links
 

1992 films
1990s Hindi-language films
1990s action drama films
1990s crime action films
Films scored by Anu Malik
Films scored by Anand–Milind
Indian action drama films
Twins in Indian films
Indian crime action films
Films directed by Ashok Gaikwad
1992 drama films